Voices of Bishara is a studio album by The Smile and Sons of Kemet drummer Tom Skinner, released 4 November 2022 by via Nonesuch Records, International Anthem Recording Company, and Brownswood Recordings. The album has been ranked among the best jazz albums of 2022 by multiple critics.

Background 
The album is Skinner's first solo album under his real name, having previously released two albums under the name Hello Skinny. The album was announced 7 September along with the release of the lead single "Bishara". The album and lead single are named after Abdul Wadud's record label Bishara which released his solo album By Myself. Skinner described the album as "an attempt to put something truthful into the world, through collaboration and community, at a time of rising dishonesty and disinformation." "Bishara" is an Arabic word which means "good news" or "bringer of good news". The second single "The Journey" was released 18 October alongside a live performance video of the song which was recorded at St. Luke's Church in London.

The album was recorded in a single day with all five performers – drummer Skinner, saxophonist Shabaka Hutchings, bassist Tom Herbert, saxophonist Nubya Garcia, and cellist Kareem Dayes – recording live simultaneously in the same room. Instruments bled into each other's microphones during the recording process, an accidental effect which Skinner accentuated by using editing to emphasise his cuts and create loops from the best improvisatory flourishes.

Style and reception 

All About Jazzs Chris May called the album "one of the top three jazz albums of 2022 so far and it would take the second comings of John Coltrane, Charles Mingus, Horace Silver and Lee Morgan to threaten to dislodge it." Voices of Bishara consists of "just over thirty minutes of exalted jazz" which is frequently "tumultuous such as "when [Shabaka] Hutchings and [Nubya] Garcia unleash their broken-note strewn tenors" and meditative as "when Hutchings switches to bass clarinet, Garcia to flute, and [Kareem] Dayes' sonorous cello steps forward." May also ranked the album among his five runners up for the best new album of 2022.

Trebles Noah Sparkes notes the presence of Dayes' cello as a tribute to Abdul Wadud, a jazz cellist who once said he "hope[d] there [would] be more who take [the cello] further and do more things, because the instrument needs it". Dayes' "deft and varied playing ... only adds to the unique sound" of the album, which is "a terrific affirmation of what makes Skinner so interesting as both a drummer and now a composer" with tracks that "may drift at different times into hip hop, funk, or free jazz" but never "in a way that seems jarring or forced". In describing Skinner's editing method on the album, The Guardians Ammar Kalia says its "mood lands somewhere between contemporary Chicago producer Makaya McCraven's beat-splicing and Don Cherry's spiritually influenced 70s melodies.

Year-end lists

Track listing

Personnel

Musicians 
 Tom Skinner – drums
 Kareem Dayes – cello
 Nubya Garcia – tenor saxophone, flute
 Tom Herbert – acoustic bass
 Shabaka Hutchings – tenor saxophone, bass clarinet

Technical 
 Tom Skinner – producer
 Blue May - recording engineer
 Scott Knapper - assistant recording engineer
 Dilip Harris - mixing engineer
 Guy Davie - mastering engineer
 Paul Camo - sleeve design, artwork
 Craig Hansen - layout

References 

2022 albums
Tom Skinner albums
Nonesuch Records albums
International Anthem Recording Company albums
Brownswood Recordings albums
Jazz albums by British artists